St Joseph’s Industrial School, generally referred to as Ferryhouse, is located four kilometres east of Clonmel, in County Tipperary, Ireland. The original building was erected in 1884 by Count Arthur Moore, a wealthy local Catholic as a reformatory for boys. Shortly after its construction, Moore invited the Rosminians to run the school.

History
Arthur John Moore was an enthusiastic supporter of the new Industrial Schools as an alternative to the detention of children in Workhouses.  However, his motives for establishing Ferryhouse may not have been entirely altruistic. At this time he was running for Parliament and the building of the school, which had widespread popular support, was completed just in time for the 1880 General election. Moore was successfully returned to Westminster for the Home Rule Party.

In January 1885, a Certificate was granted by the State for the school to receive 150 boys and in 1944 this Certificate was increased to 200. The numbers in Ferryhouse ranged from 189 boys in 1940, increasing to a high of 205 in 1960. This number decreased to 160 in 1970. There were between 150 and 200 boys in Ferryhouse until the 1970s. Thereafter, the numbers began to gradually decline but until the 1980s, the numbers were far in excess of the certified number.

Scandal
Like many residential institutions in the country, in 2009, following publication of the Ryan report, Ferryhouse was finally recognised as a place of systematic physical and sexual abuse of children carried on over a period of many years. Michael O'Brien, a survivor of abuse and a former pupil of the school, spoke on Questions and Answers of how he suffered horrendous physical and sexual abuse at the hands of the Rosminians, and how it affects him to this day.

As late as 2002, such allegations  were questioned by the Government of the day as to their veracity.

See also
 Industrial school
 St. Patrick's Industrial School, Upton
 Artane Industrial school
 St Joseph's Industrial School, Letterfrack
 Magdalen Asylum
 Clonmel Borstal

References

Sources
 St Joseph’s Industrial School, (‘Ferryhouse’), 1885–1999 extract from Ryan Report resulting from Laffoy Commission.
 St. Joseph's, Ferryhouse - Official site
 
 Task force on child care services: final report to the Minister for Health Dept. of Health, Ireland, Stationery Office, 1980.

External links
 Arthur Moore bio. at Catholic Encyclopaedia
 RTÉ radio documentary. "The Runners" - is about Jemmy Gunnery - a Dublin man who helped break children out of and escape from state industrial schools during the 1960s. Focus on Ferryhouse.

Boys' schools in the Republic of Ireland
Buildings and structures in Clonmel
Education in County Tipperary
Industrial schools in the Republic of Ireland
Youth detention centers
Violence against men in Europe